5 Serpentis is a wide binary star system in Serpens Caput, the western section of the equatorial constellation of Serpens. It is faintly visible to the naked eye with an apparent visual magnitude of 5.10. The brighter member is an IAU radial velocity standard star, and it is moving away from the Sun with a heliocentric radial velocity of +54.3 km/s.

The primary, component A, is an F-type subgiant star with a stellar classification of F8 IV, a star that has exhausted its core hydrogen and is evolving to become a red giant. The star was once thought to be a BY Draconis variable with the variable star designation MQ Ser, but has been found not to be. From observations made between 1975 and 1980, Bakos (1983) reported random, small brightness variations with an amplitude of less than 0.03 magnitude, plus three flare events that increased the brightness by 0.1 magnitudes. However, Scarfe (1985) noted that these observations may instead be due to normal observational error.

The common proper motion companion, component B, is a magnitude 10.11 star at an angular separation of  along a position angle of 35°. It has an estimated orbital period of 3,371 years. According to Hoffleit (1991), if this is a variable star it may account for the observations of Bakos (1983).

References

F-type subgiants
BY Draconis variables
Binary stars
Serpens (constellation)
Durchmusterung objects
Serpentis, 05
136202
074975
5694
Serpentis, MQ